Turanganui River or Tūranganui River may refer to:

 Turanganui River (Gisborne)
 Tūranganui River (Wellington)